Our House is an Australian dance music band formed by Melbourne-based DJ's Sean Quinn and Kasey Taylor.

The Our House debut single "Feel My Love" was released in 1994. The follow-up single, "Dreams" reached Number 2 on the French Charts. The Our House single "Floorspace" was nominated for the 1997 ARIA Award for Best Dance Release and reached number 2 on the UK Dance charts.

In 2004 Our House released its debut album Is Your House, Our House.

Band members
Sean Quinn
Kasey Taylor

Discography

Studio albums

Singles
"Feel My Love" (1994)
"Our House" (1995)
"Floorspace" (1996)
"Floating" (1998)
"Soliton Wave" / "Forced" (2001)
"Twilight" / "Fire & Ice" (2002)

Awards

ARIA Music Awards
The ARIA Music Awards is an annual awards ceremony that recognises excellence, innovation, and achievement across all genres of Australian music.

|-
| 1997
| Floorspace
| ARIA Award for Best Dance Release
| 
|-

References

Australian dance music groups